Giovan C. Profita (Acquaviva Platani, 13 August 1960) is an Italian philanthropist. Expert in Economics and Management of the multimedial and audiovisual communication industry. He is author of books and essays regarding support systems to audiovisual production, with a particular focus on the juridical, fiscal and economic implications, and on the relationship existing between content industry and intellectual property.

He is Rector of the Saint Camillus International University of Health and Medical Sciences (UniCamillus) in Rome, President of the Foundation Progetto Salute and of the Organisation of archaeological research “Virgil Academy”. 

He is Founder and President until 2006 of the Italian Cultural Coalition for the Treaty on cultural diversity in view of the WTO Doha Round. In 2004-2005 he was General Manager of the SIAE (Italian Society of Authors and Composers). From 2002 to 2004, he was General Manager for Cinematography, by the Ministry of Cultural Heritage.

Academic career 
Since 2018 he has been President of the Organising Technical Committee of UniCamillus University in Rome. He taught "Production and Management in the field of Entertainment" at the Faculty of Humanities and Arts, University La Sapienza in Rome. From 2001 until 2006 he taught "Audiovisual and Multimedial Economics" at the Faculty of Political Science, University L.U.I.S.S.in Rome, and "Organization and Economics in the field of Entertainment", at the Faculty of Education Sciences, University of Udine.

Main Publications 
Film financing strategies: new developments. Entertainment Law Review, London, June 2008.
Il sostegno al Cinema italiano introdotto dalla Finanziaria 2008 e Panoramica internazionale degli schemi pubblici di agevolazioni fiscali. Edizioni Kappa Dicembre 2007.
Il panorama europeo degli audiovisivi : regole, prospettive e sviluppo imprenditoriale. Edizioni Kappa, 2005.
L' Europa dei film: sostegni comunitari all'industria cinematografica. Edizioni Kappa, 2004
Study on the harmonization of the European juridical framework related to national support schemes for the audiovisual sector. Entertainment Law Review, Sweet & Maxwell, London, June 2002.
L' industria audiovisiva italiana ed europea alle soglie della rivoluzione digitale. F. Angeli, 2001.
Le nuove competenze nella società dell'informazione. F. Angeli, 2000.

References

Italian businesspeople
1960 births
Living people